Hoole is a suburb in the east of Chester, in the unitary authority of Cheshire West and Chester and the ceremonial county of Cheshire, England. The area is contiguous with Newton to the north and Vicars Cross to the south.

At the 2011 census the population of the electoral ward of Newton and Hoole was 9,359.

History
The settlement was first mentioned in the Register of the Abbey of Saint Werburgh in 1119. 
The name derives from the Old English word hol and is believed to mean "at the hollow" (or hole), possibly referring to the "hollow way" formed by a Roman roadway.
 
Hoole was a township in Broxton Hundred which became a civil parish in 1866. The population was recorded at 177 in 1801, 427 in 1851, 5,341 in 1901 and rising to 9,056 by 1951. Hoole was also a separate urban district in Cheshire until 1 April 1954 when it was made part of the County Borough of Chester. The civil parish was also abolished at the same time.  

On 17 July 2009 sixteen flats on Hoole Lane were destroyed following an explosion on the first floor. More than thirty firefighters tackled the resulting fire at the two-storey building in Wharton Court.

Community

Hoole is a residential area consisting of mainly Victorian terraced houses and 1930s semi-detached houses. Hoole Road is a designated conservation area. Due to the proximity of the area to Chester city centre, Chester railway station and the M53 motorway, the area is home to many hotels, guest houses and bed and breakfast establishments.

The main shopping streets are Faulkner Street and Charles Street, Hoole has a Post Office branch with cash machine facilities. Open spaces in Hoole include Alexandra Park which provides tennis courts, bowling greens and a children's play area and the Coronation Playing Fields.
A large area of allotments is accessible from both Canadian Avenue and Hoole Lane.

The annual Hoole Christmas Lights switch-on by a local celebrity attracts crowds of thousands to Faulkner Street. The event celebrated its 20th anniversary in 2019.

Places of worship
There are four churches in Hoole: Anglican (All Saints' Church), Baptist, Methodist and United Reformed. These churches work together to host Hoole's largest free annual event 'Funday on a Sunday', which attracted more than 6,000 people in July 2006. This event was held in previous years in Alexandra Park, but in 2006 moved to the nearby, larger, Coronation Playing Fields. The Funday event was held on the Coronation Playing Fields again in 2007 and 2008, by which time it had become part of the Chester-wide Chesterfest organised by churches in Chester.

Transport
The A56 Hoole Road is the main thoroughfare through the suburb. It connects Chester city centre with the A41, the A55 the M53 motorway (at junction 12). The Millennium Greenway footpath and cycle way runs along a former railway trackbed. 

Notable residents
RAF pilot and charity founder Leonard Cheshire was born (on 7 September 1917) at 65 Hoole Road, which is now a guest house.

Russ Abbot (born Russell Allan Roberts on 18 September 1947), is the lead singer of the Black Abbots and later become a solo comedian.

Ainsley Harriott lives in Hoole with his girlfriend and son.

References

External links

A Virtual Stroll Around Hoole
The Hoole Business Directory
Hoole Lawn Tennis Club

Areas of Chester